Tim Wright (1952 – August 4, 2013) was an American musician. He was the original bassist with the Cleveland, Ohio band Pere Ubu, appearing on their earliest singles but leaving the band before they recorded a full-length album. Wright moved to New York City, where he joined Arto Lindsay in the no wave band DNA. He stayed with the group until they disbanded in 1982. Wright also contributed to My Life in the Bush of Ghosts (1981) by Brian Eno and David Byrne.

Timothy Wright was born in Cleveland, Ohio in 1952. He died of cancer on August 4, 2013, aged 61.

References

1950 births
2013 deaths
Musicians from Cleveland
American rock bass guitarists
American male bass guitarists
Pere Ubu members
Deaths from cancer
Guitarists from Ohio
20th-century American bass guitarists
20th-century American male musicians